Wenceslaus Wodiczka, also known as Václav Vodička (c. 1715-1774), was a Bohemian composer who worked at the courts of the Bavarian  Prince-Electors Karl Albrecht and Maximilian III Joseph.

Life
Born into feudal bondage, he was claimed to have purchased his freedom from the Count von Wieznik with a team of horses. In 1732 he began his service at the court of Bavaria, initially as a violinist. In 1746 he married the soprano Maria Johann Brentani (c. 1715 - 1781); their daughter Walburga (b. 1749) became a professional singer at the court opera. In 1747 Wodiczka was appointed Konzertmeister and also a state councillor. He was active as a teacher and composer, and was acquainted with the Mozart family. He died in Munich in 1774, where he was buried on 1 July.

Works
Wodiczka published his op. 1, a set of six violin sonatas, in Paris in 1739. He wrote 48 symphonies for the court church in Munich, of which 24 are lost. He also wrote a violin method, published in Amsterdam in 1757. His set of eight sonatas, op.2 (1742) for violin includes four which may be played on the flute. His other works include two concertos for the flute and one for the violin.

See also

References

18th-century classical composers
18th-century male musicians
Czech Classical-period composers
18th-century Bohemian musicians
Czech male classical composers
Czech violinists
Czech expatriates in Germany
1710s births
1784 deaths